Alexsandr "Tachanka" Senaviev (Russian: Александр Сенавьев) is a fictional player character that appears in Tom Clancy's Rainbow Six Siege, a 2015 tactical online first-person shooter video game. He features on the defender roster of the game. Tachanka is one of the original 20 operators, dubbed 'pathfinders', who debuted in the game's first season, which was released on December 1, 2015. He also appears in Ubisoft's Elite Squad, free-to-play action RPG and Arknights, a mobile-based tower defense gacha video game. He was originally voiced by Anatoly Zinoviev but has been replaced by Vlad Stokanic.

Development and release 

In Rainbow Six Siege lore, Tachanka is a special forces operator in the Russian Spetsnaz. He was conscripted into military service at the age of eighteen, just as the Soviet Union was ending its operations in Afghanistan. After his draft ended, he decided to enlist in the military. Along with subject knowledge of heavy artillery, Tachanka's training focused on defensive and breaching tactics as well. He also apprenticed as a precision tool and die machinist in the weapons division. Due to his exceptional field performance, he was transferred to Spetsnaz shortly before the collapse of the Soviet Union. Tachanka later married and had a kid, though he is now divorced. He joined the Team Six outfit in 2015.

Commenting on the operator's development before the launch of the game, in a video produced by American magazine Wired, Ubisoft's art director Alexander Karpazis, explained why Tachanka has lagged behind other operators. He stated that, "When we designed Tachanka, we didn't know everything was to know about Rainbow Six.". Elaborating on why the operator's ability is underpowered, he commented, "But it is unfortunate that Rainbow Six always encourages movement, never staying in one place, at any given time. What that means for Tachanka is, he has a gadget where he's fixed in one place at any given time, and he's still a little bit weak for him, we'll touch on Tachanka maybe in another season."

Release 
On December 1, 2015, Ubisoft released Rainbow Six Siege after testing on a closed beta. The un-patched game had a roster of 20 operators including Tachanka. His weapons loadout options included the SASG-12 shotgun, 9X19VSN submachine gun, and GSH-18 or PMM as personal assault weapon. His gadget on release was a DP-28 Degtyarov Machine Gun, a mounted LMG.

Post-release
On November 17, 2020, Tachanka received major rework on Rainbow Six Siege servers. Tachanka is now a lot more mobile. His RP-46 Degtyaryov gadget has been replaced with the Shumikha Laucher, a launcher that "shoots grenades that generate areas of fire 1 second after the first bounce."  His previous gadget, DP27 LMG, is now available as a primary weapon option, replacing the SASG-12 shotgun. This rework comes after much demand from the community to buff up the character.

The character also received his Elite Skin with the same patch and has been well received by the community.

Appearances
Tachanka appeared in the limited time event, Operation Outbreak, along with fellow Team Six operators Ash, Montangne, Jager, Doc, Finka and Lion. The event was met with approval in the community, and saw significant increase in the pick-rate of Tachanka.

He appears in the Tom Clancy's Elite Squad, a mobile free-to-play RPG, as an unlockable character.

Tachanka is due to make an appearance in Arknights, a tower defense mobile gacha made by Chinese developers Studio Montagne and Hypergryph. The game released a sneak-peak of an image of Tachanka's character on its game art.

Reception
Tachanka is a widely popular Operator within the Rainbow Six Siege fanbase. He is known to be the game's most loved and least-picked operator in the meta ever since its launch, possibly due to being seen as an underdog in a team prior to his mobility rework. Among the Siege community, he is the subject of many memes, and the player base refers to the character as "Our Lord" or "Lord Tachanka".

References

Fictional Soviet–Afghan War veterans
Fictional military personnel in video games
Fictional soldiers in video games
Fictional Spetsnaz personnel
Fictional Russian people in video games
Male characters in video games
Tom Clancy characters
Ubisoft characters
Video game characters introduced in 2015